The National Football League Third Division (NFL 3rd Division) was a league competition featuring football clubs from India. Founded in 2006 through the All India Football Federation (AIFF), the NFL was the first third division football league in India to be organized on a national scale. The league was played from 25th November up to 18th December 2006 as a promotional tournament for Indian National Football League Second Division. Five teams were promoted to the second division.

Promoted to National Football League Second Division

See also

 Federation Cup
 I-League 2nd Division
 Indian National Football League
 Indian Super Cup (1997–2011)
 Indian Super League
 Super Cup

References

 
Defunct football leagues in India
Sports leagues established in 1996
Organizations disestablished in 2007
Professional sports leagues in India
India
Football leagues in India